Gogoşu may refer to several places in Romania:

 Gogoșu, Dolj, a commune in Dolj County
 Gogoșu, Mehedinți, a commune in Mehedinţi County